Brigantine Inlet is an inlet connecting Little Bay with the Atlantic Ocean in Atlantic County, New Jersey.

Geography
Brigantine Inlet separates Brigantine Island from Little Beach, and including its continuation, Brigantine Channel, connects Little Bay with the Atlantic Ocean.

It was described in 1834 as,

Brigantine Inlet was described in 1878, viz.,

History
Brigantine Inlet is named on a map published in 1749 by Lewis Evans, although it appears, unlabeled, on earlier maps. The inlet had closed by 1800, about the time of the opening of Little Egg Inlet, and, as abovementioned, was still closed in 1834. Shortly thereafter, Brigantine Inlet had reopened. The Annual Report of the New Jersey State Geologist for 1905 addressed and described the dynamic of the opening and closing of inlets in the Little Egg Harbor area:

See also 
Brigantine Island
Little Beach

References 

Inlets of New Jersey
Bodies of water of Atlantic County, New Jersey